Ground Intelligence Officer (MOS 0203) is a primary military occupation code (or MOS) of a U.S. Marine Corps intelligence officer. Ground intelligence officers serve as staff officers and commanders in the operating forces and are responsible for analyzing intelligence and planning, deployment and tactical employment of ground surveillance and reconnaissance units. The Ground Intelligence Officer can be a Recon Marine after their training is done.

Preliminary  requirements
Before anyone can be accepted for Ground Intelligence (or Ground Intel), a candidate must fulfill the following prerequisites:

Must be a U.S. citizen.
Must be eligible for a top-secret security clearance and access to Sensitive Compartmented Information (SCI), predicated upon a Single Scope Background Investigation (SSBI). An application for the SSBI must be submitted prior to attendance of the Ground Intelligence Officers Course at NMITC, Dam Neck, Virginia.
Must be a lieutenant to be assigned this MOS as a primary MOS. Officers assigned this MOS will retain it as an additional MOS following completion of the MAGTF Intelligence Officer Course and re-designation as a 0202 MAGTF Intelligence Officer.

This field was opened to female Marine officers in October 2013, with a date effective June 2013, but as yet no female has met the prerequisite training to be eligible.

Training
A Marine Corps Officer takes three more courses before he becomes an Intel Officer after graduating from The Basic School. Entry-level Marine Intelligence Officers receive specific training at the following courses: Infantry Officer's Course (IOC), Scout Sniper Unit Leader's Course (SSULC), and the Ground Intelligence Officer's Course (GIOC). The following courses of instruction are desirable as skills progression courses for MOS 0203:

Survival, Evasion, Resistance and Escape (SERE) course
Intel Collection Management Course, Washington, DC
Foreign Weapons Instructor Course (FWIC), Quantico, VA
Combat Targeting Course, Goodfellow Air Force Base, Texas
Indications and Warnings Course, Washington, DC
Intelligence Analyst Course, Washington, DC
Basic Reconnaissance Course (BRC)

Upon completion of this school pipeline, the Lt. is assigned to a recon, sniper or other ground intelligence unit.  He may also serve as the assistant intelligence officer at a regular infantry battalion. He then would serve as commander of the reconnaissance companies within the reconnaissance battalions.

Advanced Training
When slots become available and the FMF budget permits it, the Recon Marines commander may attend other advanced courses from  cross-service schools. Here are the following schools that are attended, if available:

Marine Corps  Combatant Diver Course*  — Navy Diving Salvage and Training  Center, Naval Support Activity Panama City,  Florida
Survival, Evasion, Resistance and Escape  School* —  Navy Remote Training Sites; NAS North Island, California or NAS Brunswick, Maine
Army Airborne School* — Fort Benning,  Georgia
United States Army Static Line Jumpmaster School (Fort Benning, Georgia)
United States Army Ranger School (Fort Benning, Georgia)
Special  Operations Training Group Schools (i.e. Urban Sniper, HRST, etc.)  (SOTG)* — One SOTG exists under each MEF; I MEF, II MEF, and III MEF.
Recon and Surveillance Leaders Course — Ranger School,  Fort Benning, Georgia
Pathfinder Course  — Army Infantry School, Fort Benning,  or Army Air Assault School, Fort Campbell, Kentucky
Military Free Fall (John F. Kennedy Special Warfare Center) / Multi Mission Parachutist Course (CPS Coolidge, Arizona)Military Free Fall  (Jumpmaster) School — John F. Kennedy Special Warfare Center and SchoolMountain Leaders (Summer/Winter) Course — Pickle Meadows, CAScout Sniper Course — School of Infantry (West), Camp Pendleton, California; Camp Lejeune, North Carolina;  Quantico, Virginia;  or MCB HawaiiMountain Sniper (Bridgeport, California)Reconnaissance Team Leader Course (Camp Pendleton, California)Scout/Sniper Team Leader CourseMethods of Entry / Breacher (MCB Quantico, Virginia)Joint Terminal Attack Controller (Expeditionary Warfare Training Group Atlantic/Pacific)High Risk Personnel  (HRP) Course —''' MCB Quantico

Mission
Ground intelligence officers are trained as the primary platoon commanders in division reconnaissance companies, infantry battalion scout/sniper platoons, and other ground intelligence assignments: Battalion, Regiment, and Division Staffs; Force Service Support Groups; and Intelligence Battalions. Ground intelligence officers serve as commanders of the reconnaissance companies within the reconnaissance battalions. They plan, direct, and assist in the deployment and tactical employment of ground reconnaissance units. Ground intelligence officers are responsible for the discipline and welfare of their unit's Marines. To fulfill these responsibilities they analyze and evaluate intelligence; estimate the operational situation; and formulate, coordinate, and execute appropriate plans for offensive/defensive maneuver, reconnaissance, fire support nuclear biological, and chemical defense, directed energy warfare, communications and operational logistics and maintenance.

Normally, the Recon Platoon Commander works in the Landing Force Operations Center (LFOC) or Combat Operations Center (COC). Here he receives reports from his teams, transmits direction to them & coordinates any support they need in the field. Recon Team Leaders are normally Sergeants or Staff Sergeants (some Force Recon Teams). The Team Leader is the senior man to go to the field on missions. Some missions require the full platoon to act as a unit, and in that case the Platoon Commander may also go to the field.

See also 
 MARSOC—Marine Special Operations Command
 Marine Corps Intelligence Activity
 Semper Fidelis
 Special Activities Division

References

External links 
 US Marine Corps
 Force Recon Association
 3rd Force Reconnaissance Co.
 4th Force Reconnaissance Co.
 ShadowSpear Special Operations Marine Force Reconnaissance
 SpecialOperations.com Marine Recon Page
 Marine 3rd Recon Bn., 31st MEU(SOC)
 Recon Marines

United States Marine Corps
United States intelligence agencies